Herpetopoma stictum is a species of sea snail, a marine gastropod mollusc in the family Chilodontidae.

Description
The height of the shell attains 5.3 mm.

Distribution
This species occurs in the Indian Ocean off Mauritius and Réunion.

References

External links
 To World Register of Marine Species
 

stictum
Gastropods described in 2012